Rob Cover (born 31 May 1982, Canberra, Australia) is a social theorist and media scholar, specialising in critical sexuality studies, digital media theory, minority stereotyping and media scandals, with work on LGBTIQ youth suicide, cultures of social networking and audience interactivity, as well as cultural and media representations of population. He is Professor of Digital Communication at RMIT University, Melbourne, and formerly an associate professor at The University of Western Australia, from 2013 to 2019 where he served as Deputy Head of the School of Social Sciences.  Previously, he was senior lecturer in Media at The University of Adelaide and has held visiting research and teaching fellowships at The University of Queensland, Adelaide University, and the Indian Institute of Technology, Kharagpur.

He received his PhD from Monash University, and is a frequent speaker and online commentator on contemporary media and minority issues.

He was a founding member of the Critical Suicide Studies Network, which promotes the development of theoretical and practical tools for understanding suicide derived from the humanities and social sciences, and opposes the individual pathologisation of those who suicide as found in many dominant medico-psychiatric approaches to suicide prevention and research.

Works 
The author of numerous academic journal articles and creative short fiction, his books include:
 Queer Youth Suicide, Culture and Identity: Unliveable Lives? Ashgate, 2012, 
 Vulnerability and Exposure: Footballer Scandals, Masculine Identity and Ethics, UWAP Scholarly, 2015, 
 Digital Identities: Creating and Communicating the Online Self, Elsevier, 2016, 
Emergent Identities: New Sexualities, Genders and Relationships in a Digital Era, Routledge 2018, 
Youth, Sexuality and Sexual Citizenship (co-edited with Peter Aggleton, Deana Leahy, Daniel Marshall and Mary Lou Rasmussen), Routledge 2018, 
Flirting in the Era of #MeToo: Negotiating Intimacies (co-authored with Alison Bartlett and Kyra Clarke), Palgrave 2019, 
Population, Mobility and Belonging: Understanding Population Concepts in Media, Culture and Society, Routledge 2020, 
Fake news in Digital Cultures: Technology, Populism and Digital Misinformation, Emerald 2022, 
Identity and Digital Communication: Concepts, Theories, Practices, Routledge 2023,

References

External links 
Rob Cover, Faculty Profile at The University of Western Australia
Academia Profile
ResearchGate Profile
Google Scholar Citations
On Line Opinion

Monash University alumni